SS Bothnia was a British steam passenger ship that sailed on the trans-Atlantic route between Liverpool and New York City or Boston. The ship was built by J & G Thomson of Clydebank, and launched on 4 March 1874 for the British & North American Royal Mail Steam Packet Company, which became the Cunard Line in 1879.

Constructed with an iron hull ship, and 4,535 gross register tons, and with a length of 422 feet. She was powered by a 600 hp 2-cylinder compound steam engine, barque-rigged on three masts, and had a top speed of 12 knots. She could carry up to 1,400 passengers, 300 in first class and 1,100 in 3rd class.

Bothnia sailed on her maiden voyage from Liverpool to New York via Queenstown on 8 August 1874, and on 15 April 1885, made her first voyage from Liverpool to Boston. She was withdrawn from service in mid-1898 and then sold, and was scrapped in Marseille in 1899.

References

1874 ships
Ships built on the River Clyde
Ships of the Cunard Line